is the tenth single by Japanese band Antic Cafe. The title track is featured on the album Magnya Carta. The song peaked at No. 32 on the Japanese singles chart.

Track listing
 "Smile Ichiban Ii Onna" (スマイル一番 イイ♀) - 4:12
 "Super Rabbit☆" (スーパーラビット☆)

References

An Cafe songs
2006 singles
2006 songs
Loop Ash Records singles
Songs written by Kanon (bassist)